Country Progressive Party may refer to:

 Country Progressive Party (Queensland), operated May to December 1925
 Country Progressive Party (Victoria), operated 1926 to 1930